The 2019 Malaysia Premier League is the 16th season of the Malaysia Premier League, the second-tier professional football league in Malaysia since its establishment in 2004.

Team changes
A total of 12 teams contested the league, including 8 sides from the 2018 season, 2 relegated from the 2018 Malaysia Super League and 2 promoted from the 2018 Malaysia FAM League.

To Premier League
Promoted from FAM League
 Selangor United
 Perlis 

Relegated from Super League
 Kelantan 
 Negeri Sembilan

From Premier League
Promoted to Super League
 FELDA United
 MIFA 

Relegated to M3 League
 None 

Notes: 
   Originally Terengganu City were promoted along with Selangor United as champion of the 2018 Malaysia FAM League, but after Terengganu City blocked from promotion after failing to settle unpaid wages for former players and staffs for last season campaign, Perlis Northern Lions F.C. were invited as replacement after the team are able to showcase a proper financial management.

   Originally Felcra were promoted along with Felda United to the 2019 Malaysia Super League, but after Felcra announced their withdrawal from the Super League participation, MISC-MIFA, the next highest team in the Premier League table, were invited as replacement.

   No team are relegated from last season due to Kuantan FA expulsion, and Terengganu II being granted reprieve from relegation even though they finished in the bottom two of last season's league.

Disqualification of Perlis Northern Lions F.C.
Earlier, Perlis Northern Lions F.C. together with six teams which are involved with debts are being instructed to submit financial documents before 18 February 2019. After the board of Malaysian Football League (MFL) examine in detail  the document from Perlis Northern Lions F.C., it was concluded that Perlis Northern Lions F.C.'s revenue sources including sponsorships are insufficient to manage the teams in the Malaysian League this season. MFL had made the decision to revoke Perlis Northern Lions F.C. involvement in 2019 Malaysia Premier League starting from 20 February.

Stadium and locations

Note: Table lists in alphabetical order.

 1 : PDRM used Selayang Stadium until matchday 16. They moved into Hang Jebat Stadium since matchday 17

Personnel and sponsoring

Note: Flags indicate national team as has been defined under FIFA eligibility rules. Players may hold more than one non-FIFA nationality.

Coaching changes
Note: Flags indicate national team as has been defined under FIFA eligibility rules. Players may hold more than one non-FIFA nationality.

Foreign players
The number of foreign players is restricted to four each team including at least one player from the AFC country.

Note: Flags indicate national team as has been defined under FIFA eligibility rules. Players may hold more than one non-FIFA nationality.

  Foreign players who left their clubs or were de-registered from playing squad due to medical issues or other matters.

Results

League table

Result table

Positions by round

Qualification to 2019 Malaysia Cup and Malaysia Challenge Cup

Based on the previous season, 5 teams from Malaysia Premier League will qualify into Malaysia Cup. Due to JDT II and Terengganu II status as feeder team, they cannot qualify into Malaysia Cup and will compete in Malaysia Challenge Cup. For the result, top 7 in the league besides these two teams will qualify, as JDT II and Terengganu II will finish in top 5.

Sabah FA became the first team to qualify to Malaysia Cup after Selangor United lost 2–3 to PDRM FA on June 26, given both of them 13 points difference with 4 matches remaining for Selangor United. UiTM F.C. followed Sabah to Malaysia Cup after Selangor United lost 0–2 to Kelantan FA on July 5 - even they also lost to PDRM FA one day after. On July 9, Negeri Sembilan FA became the third team to qualify after won 3–1 home by JDT II. Following 3–1 win over Kelantan FA, PDRM FA became the fourth team to qualify into Malaysia Cup. Penang FA grabbed the final slot to Malaysia Cup after demolished Sarawak FA 6–3 at home; the highest ever goal scored in this season.

Sarawak FA and Kelantan FA confirmed their places to Malaysia Challenge Cup after JDT II and Terengganu II, after PDRM FA won 2-1 by UiTM F.C. - give them 14 points and 10 points difference in 3 matches remaining for both of them respectively. After losing 2–6 to UKM F.C. on Matchday 20, Selangor United qualified into Malaysia Challenge Cup. On July 14, UKM F.C. - the inaugural Malaysia Challenge Cup runner-up, booked the slot into this competition after Penang FA won 6–3 at Bandaraya Stadium.

Relegation play-offs

Season statistics
Source:

Scoring
 First goal of the season: Adi Said for UiTM F.C. against PDRM FA, 20 seconds (1 February 2019) 
 Fastest goal in a match: 20 seconds – Adi Said for UiTM against PDRM (1 February 2019)
 Goal scored at the latest point in a match: 90+10 minutes – Akmal Zahir for UKM against Sarawak (2 March 2019) 
 First own goal of the season: Rawilson Batuil (Sabah) for Kelantan, 53 minutes (8 February 2019)
 First hat-trick of the season: Žarko Korać (UiTM) against Kelantan, 71 minutes (8 March)
 Fastest hat-trick of the season: Bruno Suzuki (Terengganu II) against UKM, 11 minutes and 52 seconds (26 June)
 Most goals scored by one player in a match: 3 goals
 Žarko Korać (UiTM) against Kelantan, 13', 25', 84' (8 March 2019)
 Ferris Danial Mat Nasir (Negeri Sembilan) against Kelantan, 13', 44', 51' (20 April 2019)
 Žarko Korać (UiTM) against UKM, 14', 54', 55' (27 April 2019)
 Nicolás Fernández (JDT II) against Terengganu II, 14', 18', 89' (14 June 2019)
 Casagrande (Penang) against UiTM, 34', 47', 90+6' (19 June 2019)
 Bruno Suzuki (Terengganu II) against UKM, 11', 18', 23' (26 June 2019)
 Rodoljub Paunović (Sabah) against Sarawak, 11', 63', 84' (26 June 2019)
 Milad Zeneyedpour (UKM) against Selangor United, 31', 36', 75' (9 July 2019)
 Widest winning margin: 5 goals
 UKM 0-5 UiTM (27 April 2019)
 JDT II 5-0 Terengganu II (14 June 2019)
 Most goals in a match: 9 goals - Penang 6-3 Sarawak (14 July 2019)
 Most goals in one half: 5 goals 
Selangor United vs UKM (9 July 2019) 0–3 at half time, 2–6 final 
Penang vs Sarawak (14 July 2019) 5–0 at half time, 6–3 final 
 Most goals in one half by a single team: 5 goals - Penang vs Sarawak (14 July 2019) 5–0 at half time, 6–3 final

Top scorers

Players sorted first by goals, then by last name.

1 Aguero played for Selangor United until matchday 12 and scored 2 goals.

Hat-tricks

Clean sheets

Players sorted first by clean sheets, then by last name.

  Clean sheets are given to players who spend at least 45 minutes on the pitch without conceding a goal, even if their team concedes in the remainder of the match.
 Most clean sheets – Terengganu II (9)
 Fewest clean sheets – Sarawak (3)

Discipline 

 First yellow card of the season: Shahurain Abu Samah for PDRM against UiTM, 23 minutes (1 February 2019)
 First red card of the season: Danial Haqim Draman for Kelantan against Sabah, 89 minutes (8 February 2019)
 Card given at latest point in a game: 90+9 minutes
 Khairul Izuan (yellow) for PDRM against Penang (20 July 2019)
 Khairul Izuan (red) for PDRM against Penang (20 July 2019)
 Most yellow cards in a single match: 9
 UiTM 3-3 Penang – five for UiTM (Nazrin Bahri, Nur Areff Kamaruddin, Amer Azahar (2) and Park Yong-joon) and four for Penang (Che Safwan Hazman, Casagrande, Ezequiel Agüero and Kang Seung-jo) (19 June 2019)
 Most red cards in a single match: 3
 PDRM 1–2 Penang - three for PDRM (Khairul Izuan, Shahril Saa'ri and  Uche Agaba) (20 July 2019)

Player 

 Most yellow cards: 7
 Azwan Aripin (Kelantan)
 Rawilson Batuil (Sabah)
 Most red cards: 1
 Bruno Soares (JDT II)
 Danial Haqim Draman (Kelantan)
 Nik Akif Syahiran Nik Mat (Kelantan)
 Aiman Khalidi (Negeri Sembilan)
 Aroon Kumar Ramaloo (Negeri Sembilan)
 Norhafiz Zamani Misbah (Negeri Sembilan)
 Khairul Izuan (PDRM)
 Shahril Saa'ri (PDRM)
 Uche Agaba (PDRM)
 Khairul Akmal Rokisham (Penang)
 Wan Syukri (Penang)
 Rafiq Shah Zaim (Selangor United)
 Amer Azahar (UiTM)
 Bernard Agele (UiTM)
 Faizal Arif (UiTM)
 Park Yong-joon (UiTM)
 Žarko Korać (UiTM)
 Akmal Zahir (UKM)
 Saiful Hasnol (UKM)

Club 
 Most yellow cards: 47
 JDT II
 Most red cards: 5
 UiTM

Awards

Monthly awards

Number of teams by states

See also
 2019 Malaysia Super League
 2019 Malaysia M3 League
 2019 Malaysia M4 League
 2019 Malaysia FA Cup
 2019 Malaysia Cup
 2019 Malaysia Challenge Cup
 2019 Piala Presiden
 2019 Piala Belia
 List of Malaysian football transfers 2019

References

Malaysia Premier League seasons
1